Kyle Christopher Jacobs (June 26, 1973 – February 17, 2023) was an American country music songwriter, vocalist, guitarist, pianist, as well as a staff writer for Curb Music from 2003 until his death in February 2023. Jacobs wrote music on piano and guitar.  His hometown is Bloomington, Minnesota.

Jacobs was the co-writer on Garth Brooks' single, "More Than a Memory", which became the first song to debut at number one on Billboard's Country Singles chart. In addition to sharing author rights of Kimberley Locke's Top 10 hit, "8th World Wonder", Jacobs' songs have been recorded by artists such as Trace Adkins, Jo Dee Messina, Craig Morgan, Tim McGraw, Kellie Pickler (his wife), Clay Walker, Kelly Clarkson, Scotty McCreery, and many others. Jacobs had also collaborated with top writers and artists, including Darius Rucker, Rachel Thibodeau, and Wynonna.

Jacobs starred alongside Kellie Pickler in the CMT reality series I Love Kellie Pickler.

Personal life and death
On June 23, 2010, country music star Kellie Pickler announced her engagement to Jacobs, who proposed to her after two and a half years of dating on June 15, 2010, her late grandmother's birthday, while on a beach at sunset. Pickler and Jacobs were married on January 1, 2011. Jacobs was also part of the founding of UTEC (United Teens Encounter Christ) in the Twin Cities area of Minnesota where he played in the music team.

Jacobs died of a self-inflicted gunshot wound in Nashville, Tennessee, on February 17, 2023 at age 49.

References

External links

1973 births
2023 deaths
2023 suicides
Suicides by firearm in Tennessee
American country songwriters
American male singer-songwriters
American singer-songwriters
Country musicians from Minnesota
American country guitarists
American male guitarists
21st-century American singers
21st-century American guitarists
21st-century American male singers
Songs written by Kyle Jacobs (songwriter)
People from Bloomington, Minnesota